4,5-Dihydroxy-2,3-pentanedione (DPD) is an organic compound that occurs naturally but exists as several related structures.  The idealized formula for this species is CH3C(O)C(O)CH(OH)CH2OH, but it is known to exist as several other forms resulting from cyclization.  It is not stable at room temperature as a pure material, which has further complicated its analysis.  The (S)-stereoisomer occurs naturally.  It is typically hydrated, i.e., one keto group has added water to give the geminal diol.

DPD is produced by degradation of S-adenosylhomocysteine by the action of the enzyme S-ribosylhomocysteinase.  The compound probably does not exist as depicted above, but as an equilibrium mixture of three hydrates.

DPD is a precursor to borate diester, which is known as autoinducer-2 (AI-2).  AI-2 is a signaling molecules found in quorum sensing.  It is produced and recognized by many Gram-negative and Gram-positive bacteria. AI-2 is synthesized by the reaction of DPD with boric acid and is recognized by the two-component sensor kinase LuxPQ in Vibrionaceae.

References

Diketones
Vicinal diols
Carbohydrate chemistry
Tetrahydrofurans
Acyloins
Beta-hydroxy ketones
Conjugated ketones